The 1932 United States presidential election in Rhode Island took place on November 8, 1932, as part of the 1932 United States presidential election which was held throughout all contemporary 48 states. Voters chose four representatives, or electors to the Electoral College, who voted for president and vice president. 

Rhode Island voted for the Democratic nominee, Governor Franklin D. Roosevelt of New York, over Republican nominee, incumbent President Herbert Hoover of California. Roosevelt running mate was incumbent Speaker of the House John Nance Garner of Texas, while Hoover's running mate was incumbent Vice President Charles Curtis of Kansas.

Roosevelt won Rhode Island by a margin of 11.77%.

Results

By county

See also
 United States presidential elections in Rhode Island

References

Rhode Island
1932
1932 Rhode Island elections